Leach is a surname, originally denoting a physician (in reference to the medical practice of bloodletting). Notable people with the surname include:

A-G
 Al Leach (born 1935), Canadian transportation executive and politician
 Archie Leach (1904–1986), real name of English-American actor Cary Grant
 Ben Leach (born 1969), player in English pop group The Farm
 Bernard Leach (1887–1979), British studio potter and art teacher
 Bobby Leach (1858–1926), English circus performer, went over Niagara Falls in a barrel
 Buddy Leach (1934-2022), American politician
 Britt Leach (born 1938), American character actor
 Cecil Leach (1894–1973), English cricketer
 Dewitt C. Leach (1822–1909), U.S. Representative from Michigan
 David Leach (disambiguation)
 Edmund Leach (1910–1989), British anthropologist
 Sir Edward Pemberton Leach (1847–1913), Irish general in the British Army, recipient of the Victoria Cross
 Edward G. Leach, American politician 
 Elizabeth Eva Leach, British medievalist, musicologist and academic
 Ethel Leach (1850 or 1851 – 1936), British politician
 Esther Leach (1809-1843), English-Indian actress
 Francis Leach (born 1968), Australian radio announcer

 Garry Leach (born 1954), British comics artist and publisher
 George Leach (musician), Canadian musician and actor
 George E. Leach (1876–1955), United States Army general and politician

H-M
 Henry Leach (British Army officer) (1870–1936), British Army general
 Sir Henry Leach (1923–2011), Royal Navy admiral
 Henry Goddard Leach (1880-1970), American Scandinavian studies scholar
 Howard H. Leach, American diplomat
 Jack Leach, English cricketer 
 Jalal Leach (born 1969), American baseball player
 James Madison Leach (1815–1891), American politician from North Carolina
 James Leach (soldier) (1892–1957), British soldier and Victoria Cross holder
 Jan E. Leach (born 1952/1953), American plant pathologist
 Jason Leach (born 1982), American football player
 Jesse Leach (born 1978), American musician
 Jim Leach (born 1942), American politician from Iowa 
 Joe Leach (born 1990), English cricketer 
 John Leach (disambiguation)
 Joshua A. Leach (1843-1919) — founder of the Brotherhood of Locomotive Firemen
 Karoline Leach (born 1967), British playwright and author
 Lillian Leach (1936–2013), American singer
 Mandy Leach (born 1979), Zimbabwean freestyle swimmer
 Martin Leach (executive), British businessman and engineer
 Mary Leach (disambiguation), multiple people
 Martin Leach (Australian murderer) (born 1959), Australian convicted murderer and rapist
 Mick Leach (1947–1992), English soccer player
 Mike Leach (tennis) (born 1960), American tennis player
 Mike Leach (American football coach) (1961–2022), American football coach
 Mike Leach (long snapper) (born 1976), American football player

N-W
 Neil Leach, British architect and theorist
 Nicole Leach (born 1979), American actress and singer
 Penelope Leach (born 1937), British child psychologist and parenting author
 Reggie Leach (born 1950), Canadian professional ice hockey player
 Rick Leach (born 1964), American tennis player and coach
 Rick Leach (baseball) (born 1957), American baseball and football player
 Robert M. Leach (1879–1952), United States Representative from Massachusetts
 Robert E. Leach (1911–1993), Republican judge in the U.S. State of Ohio
 Robin Leach (1941-2018), English entertainer
 Rosemary Leach (1935–2017), English stage, television and film actress
 Sheryl Leach (born 1952), American children's TV show creator and author, known for the series Barney & Friends
 Steve Leach (ice hockey) (born 1966), American ice hockey player
 Steve Leach (cricketer) (born 1993), English cricketer 
 Terry Leach (born 1954), former Major League Baseball player
 Tommy Leach (1877–1969), Major League Baseball player
 Vonta Leach (born 1981), American football fullback for the Houston Texans
 William Leach (disambiguation), multiple people

See also
 Leach (disambiguation)
 Leech (disambiguation)

English-language surnames
Occupational surnames
English-language occupational surnames